Helmut Bergmann (26 May 1920 – 6 August 1944) was a German Luftwaffe military aviator during World War II, a night fighter ace credited with 36 enemy aircraft shot down in 135 combat missions.  All of his victories were claimed over the Western Front in nocturnal Defense of the Reich missions against the Royal Air Force's Bomber Command.

Born in Bochum, Bergmann volunteered for military service in the Luftwaffe of Nazi Germany in 1939 after finishing school. Following flight training, he was initially posted to Nachtjagdgeschwader 1 (NJG 1—1st Night Fighter Wing) in 1941 before he transferred to Nachtjagdgeschwader 4 (NJG 4—4th Night Fighter Wing). He claimed his first aerial victory on 19/20 September 1942 and was awarded the Knight's Cross of the Iron Cross on 9 June 1944. Two months later, on 6 August 1944, he and his crew were killed in action during Operation Lüttich.

Early life and career
Bergmann was born on 26 May 1920 in Bochum, the son of Heinrich Bergmann who later served as a Major in the Luftwaffe, and his wife Edith. In his childhood, Bergmann was a member of the Hitler Youth and underwent his recruit training in Straubing. He then received his flight training at the Flugzeugführerschule A/B in Eger, present-day Cheb in the Czech Republic. He was then selected to train as a night fighter pilot and posted to the blind flying school Blindflugschule 3 (BFS 3—3rd blind flying school) at Schwäbisch Hall. There, he trained together with Heinz-Wolfgang Schnaufer.

After completing pilot training in July 1941, he was assigned to the Ergänzungsstaffel (Training/Supplement Squadron) of Nachtjagdgeschwader 1 (NJG 1—1st Night Fighter Wing) on 15 July.

World War II

Following the 1939 aerial Battle of the Heligoland Bight, bombing missions by the Royal Air Force (RAF) shifted to the cover of darkness, initiating the Defence of the Reich campaign. By mid-1940, Generalmajor (Brigadier General) Josef Kammhuber had established a night air defense system dubbed the Kammhuber Line. It consisted of a series of control sectors equipped with radars and searchlights and an associated night fighter. Each sector, named a Himmelbett (canopy bed), would direct the night fighter into visual range with target bombers. In 1941, the Luftwaffe started equipping night fighters with airborne radar such as the Lichtenstein radar. This airborne radar did not come into general use until early 1942.

Bergmann was assigned to 7. Staffel (7th squadron) of Nachtjagdgeschwader 4 (NJG 4—4th Night Fighter Wing) on 1 May 1942. Bergmann was promoted to Oberleutnant (first lieutenant) on 1 April 1943. On 22 April, he was appointed Staffelkapitän of 8. Staffel of NJG 4. On 23 June 1943, Bergmann and his crew were forced to bail out of their Messerschmitt Bf 110 G-4 (Werknummer 5334—factory number) following aerial combat north of Harderwijk and were injured.

10/11 April 1944
Bergmann claimed seven Avro Lancaster bombers shot down in 46 minutes on the night of 10/11 April 1944, all from an RAF Bomber Command raid on the Aulnoye-Aymeries rail marshalling yard on the Franco-Belgian frontier. All of his seven claims were confirmed and 38 Allied aircrew were killed. This was Bergmann's most successful sortie, making him an "ace-in-a-day" for the first time.

His first aerial victory of the night was Lancaster ND586 from No. 460 Squadron RAAF was shot down at 02:20 in the vicinity of Vieux-Mareuil. At 02:30, north of Solesmes, he shot down Lancaster LL830 from No. 576 Squadron RAF, 5 minutes later followed by Lancaster ND844 from No. 12 Squadron RAF. His fourth Lancaster of the night was claimed at 02:43 north of Achiet-le-Petit. At 02:50, he attacked Lancaster JB732 from No. 103 Squadron RAF which crashed at Méharicourt. Lancaster DV288 from No. 101 Squadron RAF claimed at 02:54 became his sixth aerial victory of the night. His seventh and last Lancaster shot down that night was claimed at 03:06 over Lancaster MD636 from No. 625 Squadron RAF.

Knight's Cross and death
On 4 May 1944, Bergmann was transferred to 6. Staffel of NJG 4. That evening, he claimed five further aerial victories. On 9 June 1944, he was awarded the Knight's Cross of the Iron Cross following his 34th aerial victory. The award documentation was signed on 27 September 1944, at the time, Bergmann and his crew were considered missing in action.

On 6 August 1944, Bergmann and his crew - radar operator Feldwebel Gunter Hauthal and air gunner Feldwebel Willie Schopp - were shot down and killed in their Bf 110 G-4 (Werknummer 140320) at Mortain on the Cotentin Peninsula. Flight Lieutenant John Surman, flying a Mosquito of No. 604 Squadron RAF, may have shot them down as he claimed a Bf 110 destroyed. However, friendly fire from the 1st SS Leibstandarte Panzer division who were launching Operation Lüttich, the counterattack at Mortain may have been responsible. Following the battle, his remains were found and temporarily buried. He was later reinterred at the Marigny German war cemetery (Block 3—Row 31—Grave 1182).

Summary of career

Aerial victory claims
According to Spick, Bergmann was credited with 36 nocturnal aerial victories, claimed in approximately 135 combat missions. Foreman, Mathews and Parry, authors of Luftwaffe Night Fighter Claims 1939 – 1945, list 34 nocturnal victory claims, numerically ranging from 1 to 35, not listing his 18th claim. Mathews and Foreman also published Luftwaffe Aces — Biographies and Victory Claims, listing Bergmann with 33 claims, plus two further unconfirmed claims.

Awards
 Honour Goblet of the Luftwaffe (Ehrenpokal der Luftwaffe) on 25 June 1943 as Leutnant and pilot
 German Cross in Gold on 17 October 1943 as Oberleutnant in the 8./Nachtjagdgeschwader 4
 Knight's Cross of the Iron Cross on 9 June 1944 as Hauptmann and Staffelkapitän of the 8./Nachtjagdgeschwader 4

See also
Wilhelm Herget - claimed eight RAF bombers in just 50 minutes during a raid against Frankfurt on the night of 20 December 1943.

Notes

References

Citations

Bibliography

 
 
 
 
 
 
 
 
 
 
 
 
 
 
 
 
 

1920 births
1944 deaths
Luftwaffe pilots
German World War II flying aces
Recipients of the Gold German Cross
Recipients of the Knight's Cross of the Iron Cross
Luftwaffe personnel killed in World War II
Aviators killed by being shot down
People from the Province of Westphalia
Missing in action of World War II
Aerial disappearances of military personnel in action
Hitler Youth members
Military personnel from Bochum